Manen may refer to:
 Man'en, a Japanese era
 , a former town in Gelderland, the Netherlands, now part of Ede
 Christian Manen (1934–2020), French composer and music teacher
 Juan Manén 1883 –1971), Spanish violinist and composer
 Martí Manen (born 1976), Spanish art curator

See also 
 Van Manen, a Dutch surname (including a list of people with the name)
 Mannen, a mountain in Norway
 Manan (disambiguation)